The 1996 BPR 4 Hours of Spa was the ninth round of the 1996 BPR Global GT Series season.  It was run at the Circuit de Spa-Francorchamps on 22 September 1996.

Official results
Class winners in bold.  Cars failing to complete 75% of winner's distance marked as Not Classified (NC).

Statistics
 Pole Position - #35 Porsche AG - 2:13.857
 Fastest Lap - #35 Porsche AG - 2:16.978

External links
 Race Results
 Photo Archive

Spa
Spa
Auto races in Belgium